Petya Pendareva (born 20 January 1971, in Kazanlak) is a retired Bulgarian sprinter who specialized in the 100 metres.

Achievements

Personal bests
100 metres - 11.12 s (1998)
200 metres - 22.78 s (1993)

External links
 

1971 births
Living people
Bulgarian female sprinters
Athletes (track and field) at the 1996 Summer Olympics
Athletes (track and field) at the 2000 Summer Olympics
Olympic athletes of Bulgaria
European Athletics Championships medalists
People from Kazanlak
Olympic female sprinters